Helen M. Knubel (July 10, 1901 – July 23, 1992) was an American archivist for the National Lutheran Council from 1954 to 1971.

Early life 
Helen M. Knubel was born in New York City, the daughter of Frederick Hermann Knubel and Christine A. Ritscher Knubel. Her father was president of the United Lutheran Church in America from 1918 to 1944. Her brother, Frederick R. Knubel, was head of the United Lutheran Synod of New York and New England.

Knubel survived polio as a teenager, and used a wheelchair. She attended The New School for Social Research, the Biblical Seminary of New York, and trained as a librarian at Columbia University.

Career 
Knubel worked as an archivist for the National Lutheran Council from 1954 to 1971, and "was considered the foremost archivist of the history of the Lutheran Church in North America," noted her obituary in The New York Times.  She was founder and director of the Oral History of Cooperative Lutheranism in America project. She was the author of An Introductory Guide to Lutheran Archives (1981), and The Oral History Collection of the Archives of Cooperative Lutheranism (1984 and 1987, with Alice M. Kendrick). She was also editor of the annual Lutheran Church Directory for the United States and Canada.

Knubel had a scholarly interest in early American book illustration. She wrote "Alexander Anderson and Early American Book Illustration" (Princeton University Library Chronicle, 1940), and owned fourteen of Anderson's original printing blocks.

Personal life 
Helen Knubel died in 1992 in a hospital in Bronxville, New York, aged 91 years. Her grave is in Brooklyn's Green-Wood Cemetery. The Helen M. Knubel Archives of Cooperative Lutheranism are housed at the ELCA Archives in Elk Grove Village, Illinois.

References

External links 

 A photograph taken at Lutheran Historical Conference 1964, in St. Louis, Missouri; Knubel is the only woman of the fourteen participants in this group photograph, and her wheelchair is visible; from the ELCA Archives, on Flickr.

1901 births
1992 deaths
20th-century Lutherans
20th-century American women
20th-century American people
American archivists
American Lutherans
Burials at Green-Wood Cemetery
Columbia University School of Library Service alumni
Wheelchair users
People with polio
New York Theological Seminary alumni
American librarians
The New School alumni
Female archivists
American women librarians
People from New York City